Imprint Entertainment is an American film, TV and media production company founded by former talent agent and talent manager Michael Becker, alongside Mark Morgan, former CEO of Maverick Entertainment in 2008. In 2011, Becker became sole owner and CEO. The company is located in West Hollywood, California.

History
Imprint Entertainment started in 2008 as a talent management and production company, combining the talent and projects from both Michael Becker and Mark Morgan. In 2011, Becker and Morgan split ways with Becker retaining all rights to the company and its projects.

Projects
Imprint Entertainment has more than two dozen projects currently in development, pre-production and production. The company's current credits include: The Twilight Saga, Stepfather, Soulja Boy: The Movie, Pawn, Slightly Single in L.A., Kid Cannabis, My Man Is a Loser, Lap Dance, and The Vault.

Imprint is currently in post-production on Primal, starring Nicolas Cage and an untitled sci-fi movie for the SyFy Network coming out in 2019. Additionally, Becker is an executive producer on What Is Life Worth, starring Michael Keaton & Stanley Tucci, along with Walk Away Joe co-starring Jeffrey Dean Morgan.

Film productions

 Twilight (2008) Summit Entertainment
 The Stepfather (2009) Screen Gems
 The Industry (2009)
 Twilight Saga: New Moon (2009)
 Percy Jackson and the Lightning Thief (2010)
 The Twilight Saga: Eclipse (2010)
 Soulja Boy: The Movie (2011)
 Slightly Single in L.A. (2012)
 Pawn (2013)
 My Man Is a Loser (2014) Step One of Many Entertainment 
 Kid Cannabis (2014)
 Lap Dance (2014)
 ''The Vault" (2017)

Talent formerly represented
Soulja Boy, rapper 
Pitbull, music artist
DJ Quik, rapper
Joshua Friedlander, writer

References

External links
 

Entertainment companies of the United States
Companies based in California